is the 19th single from the Japanese idol group Idoling!!!. It reached number 2 on the Tower Record weekly chart, number 2 on M-ON! Countdown 100, number 4 on Music Station Power Ranking, and number 3 on Oricon Weekly Chart.

Contents
Sakura Thank You was released in three types:
 Limited A-type Edition (CD and DVD)
 Limited B-type Edition (CD and Blu-ray)
 Normal Edition (CD)
The Limited A-type and B-type editions each features 10 members on the cover.

Limited A features #3 Mai Endo, #6 Erica Tonooka, #9 Rurika Yokoyama, #13 Serina Nagano, #14 Hitomi Sakai, #16 Ami Kikuchi, #17 Hitomi Miyake, #27 Kurumi Takahashi, #28 Karen Ishida, and #30 Reia Kiyoku.

Limited B features #12 Yui Kawamura, #15 Nao Asahi, #19 Yurika Tachibana, #20 Ai Okawa, #21 Kaede Hashimoto, #22 Ruka Kurata, #23 Yuna Ito, #25 Kaoru Goto, #26 Chika Ojima, and #29 Ramu Tamagawa.

Track listing

Limited A-type edition

CD

DVD 
 Sakura Thank You -Music Video-
 Sakura Thank You -Dancing Ver.-
 Sakura Thank You MV Making-of

Limited B-type edition

CD

Blu-ray 
 Sakura Thank You -Music Video-
 Sakura Thank You -Dancing Ver.-
 Sakura Thank You MV Making-of
 voice -Music Video-
 voice MV Making-of
 Omake

Normal edition

CD

Notes
 #24 Manami Nomoto, graduated at the end of 2012, was participated in the filming of Sakura Thank You music video.
 Sakura Thank You and Secret Xmas were performed for the first time in Idoling!!! 12th Live at NHK Hall. Sakura Thank You was freely available on YouTube as part of the promotion by using the fans' smartphone video camera to record the performance and upload it to various video hosting websites.
 Sakura Thank You music video was filmed at Tatsunoko Field in Ibaraki Prefecture.
 Secret Xmas was performed by Secret girls' members; #15 Nao Asahi, #21 Kaede Hashimoto, #23 Yuna Ito.
 voice was performed by 1st generation members; #3 Mai Endo, #6 Erica Tonooka, #9 Rurika Yokoyama.

References

External links 
 Limited B-type Edition Sakura Thank You on iTunes Japan
 Normal Edition Sakura Thank You on iTunes Japan
 Moshiwakenaito Presents IDOLING !!! LIVE DJ MIX !!! on iTunes Japan
 Idoling!!! official site - Fuji TV
 Idoling!!! official site - Pony Canyon

2013 singles
Idoling!!! songs
2013 songs
Pony Canyon singles